RAN binding protein 3-like is a protein in humans that is encoded by the RANBP3L gene.

References

Further reading 

Genes on human chromosome 5